Take Down is a 1979 American comedy-drama sports film directed by Kieth Merrill and released by Buena Vista Distribution Company. The plot concerns an unqualified teacher who finds himself saddled with coaching duties after a small group of high school seniors form a wrestling team in a last-ditch effort to end a 9-year losing streak against a rival school.

Plot 
Ed Branish, a snooty English teacher who finds his situation at Mingo Junction High School far beneath him and barely tolerable, flaunts his air of superiority over all, including his supportive wife, by frequently spouting platitudes from literary masters to validate his often contemptuous viewpoint. Even his wife is starting to show signs of getting fed up with his narcissism.

His habit of having as little to do with his school as possible finally gets the better of him when his light schedule makes him the only staff member available to supervise the newly formed wrestling team. Cornered, he lashes out at the first student to cross his path – Nick Kilvitus, a reserved 185 lbs. senior who's embarrassed by his near-poverty social status and who's also missed a lot of classes lately. No one realizes Nick's been filling in for his alcoholic father at a steel mill hauling I-beams when his dad's too drunk or hung over to show up (which is all too often), and which also keeps Nick busy at night fishing his embittered father out of bars – to be carried home across town because they don't have a working car.

Nick hopes he can make up the missed school work in Ed's class to graduate in Spring but instead gets a tongue-lashing on how he should be held back as an example of the consequences of laziness and irresponsibility. In turn, Nick calls Ed an "Egotistical snob" telling him that he is more interested in proving how book smart he is instead of teaching and as a result he is clueless when it comes to the real world and its everyday problems. Fortunately, because of the wrestling team, both will cross paths again and discover they each have much more to them than what they were previously aware.

Cast
 Edward Herrmann as Ed Branish
 Kathleen Lloyd as Jill Branish
 Lorenzo Lamas as Nick Kilvitus
 Maureen McCormick as Brooke Cooper
 Maxx Payne as Ted Yacabobich
 Stephen Furst as Randy Jensen
 Toney Smith as Chauncey Washington
 Salvador Feliciano as Tom Palumbo
 Boyd Silversmith as Jack Gross
 Nicolas Beauvy as Jimmy Kier
 Kevin Hooks as Jasper MacGrudder
 Scott Burgi as Robert Stankovich
 Lynn Baird as "Doc" Talada
 Ron Bartholomew as Warren Overpeck
 Vincent Roberts as Bobby Cooper
 David M. Thorne as Hood #2
 Ray Perry as The Masked Wrestler

Production 
Take Down was filmed primarily in Utah, at the old American Fork High School campus prior to its being demolished and rebuilt. Scenes at other schools include a wrestling match shot at Murray High School in Murray, Utah. It was also filmed in Orem.

The movie was the first film produced by the American Film Consortium and had a budget of $2 million. Buena Vista Distribution Company acquired it for distribution, their first non-Disney release since Don't Look Now... We're Being Shot At! in 1969. This was the first film with a PG rating released by Disney, five years before they launched Touchstone Pictures to expand into the "adult" market.

Release 
Take Down was initially released January 1979 in the Salt Lake City area by American Film. Disney then bought the film rights and released it March 2, 1979 in Northern and Southern California, the Carolinas and the Midwest and grossed $2 million, which was not in line with Disney's expectations. Taft International Pictures later acquired the film.

Home media 
The film was released on VHS by Unicorn Video in the 1980s.

References

External links 
 
 

1979 films
1979 independent films
1970s sports comedy-drama films
Sport wrestling films
Films directed by Kieth Merrill
American sports comedy-drama films
American independent films
Films shot in Utah
Films distributed by Disney
1970s English-language films
1970s American films